Sharon Township is one of the eighteen townships of Richland County, Ohio, United States.  It is a part of the Mansfield Metropolitan Statistical Area.  The 2000 census found 9,720 people in the township, 991 of whom lived in the unincorporated portions of the township.

Geography
Located in the northwestern part of the county, it borders the following townships:
Plymouth Township - north
Cass Township - northeast corner
Jackson Township - east
Springfield Township - southeast
Sandusky Township - south
Jackson Township, Crawford County - southwest
Vernon Township, Crawford County - west
Auburn Township, Crawford County - northwest corner

Most of the city of Shelby is located in northeastern Sharon Township.

Name and history
Statewide, other Sharon Townships are located in Franklin, Medina, and Noble counties.

Government
The township is governed by a three-member board of trustees, who are elected in November of odd-numbered years to a four-year term beginning on the following January 1. Two are elected in the year after the presidential election and one is elected in the year before it. There is also an elected township fiscal officer, who serves a four-year term beginning on April 1 of the year after the election, which is held in November of the year before the presidential election. Vacancies in the fiscal officership or on the board of trustees are filled by the remaining trustees.

References

External links
County website

Townships in Richland County, Ohio
Townships in Ohio